= Chubby Fish =

Restaurant in Charleston, South Carolina, U.S.

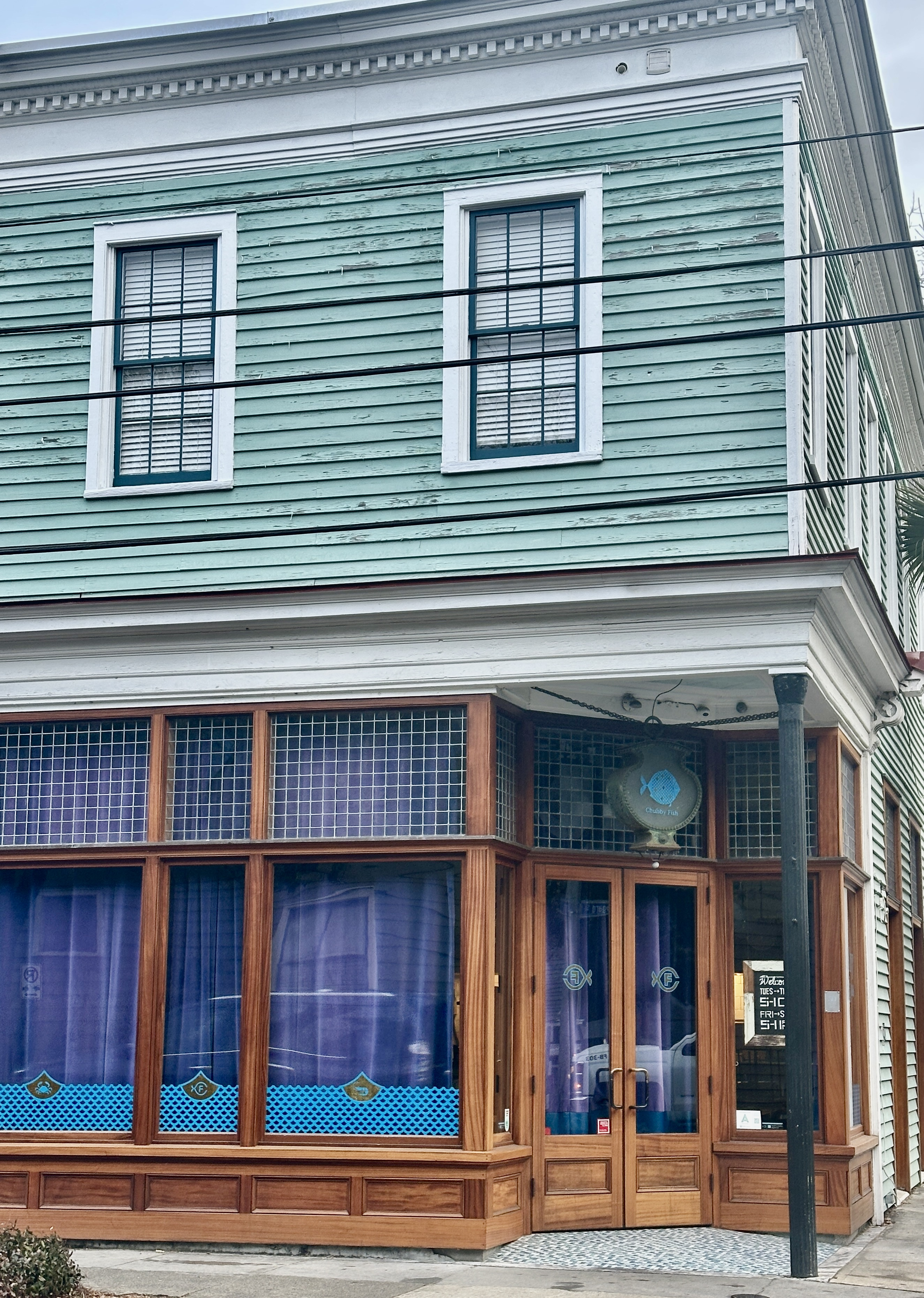
- Interactive map of Chubby Fish

Restaurant information
- Chef: James London
- Food type: Seafood
- Location: 252 Coming Street, Charleston, South Carolina, United States
- Coordinates: 32.7932°N 79.9443°W
- Website: chubbyfishcharleston.com

Chubby Fish is a restaurant in Charleston, South Carolina, United States. The chef and co-owner of the restaurant is James London.
